Lorton is a census-designated place (CDP) in Fairfax County, Virginia, United States. The population was 20,072 as of the 2020 census.

History
Lorton is named for a village in the Lake District National Park, Cumbria, in England. Joseph Plaskett of the Cumbrian village settled in southern Fairfax County, running a general store and opening the Lorton Valley Post Office on November 11, 1875.

Before the identity of Lorton, the commercial center was Colchester, and the spiritual and historical center of the community around which the leading citizens of the time revolved was Pohick Church, where George Washington and George Mason were at times members of the vestry.

From the early 20th century until November 2001, Lorton was the site of a District of Columbia correctional facility called the Lorton Reformatory which, among other things, detained approximately 168 women from the women's suffrage movement from the Washington, D.C. area from June to December 1917. For the 2010 census, the area around the former Lorton Reformatory was assigned to the Laurel Hill census-designated place, reducing the area and population of the Lorton CDP.

A Nike missile site was built at Lorton in 1955, and remained until 1973.

Lorton is one of the two stations that serve Amtrak's Auto Train which carries passengers and their vehicles non-stop to Sanford, Florida, in the Orlando area. The Lorton and Occoquan Railroad once operated between the Lorton Reformatory and Occoquan, with connection to the Richmond, Fredericksburg and Potomac Railroad.

Historic landmarks in the surrounding area include Gunston Hall, George Mason's home; Belvoir, which was William Fairfax's home; the Market; and now the Fort Belvoir Army Corps of Engineers base and Cranford Church. Woodlawn Plantation and Mount Vernon, the latter being George Washington's home on the Potomac River, lie farther to the east.

Geography
Lorton is located in southern Fairfax County at  (38.704915, −77.233573). It is bordered to the west by Laurel Hill, to the north by Newington, to the east by Fort Belvoir, to the southeast by Mason Neck, and to the southwest by Woodbridge in Prince William County.

The elevation ranges from sea level at the Prince William County line (the Occoquan River) to slightly over  along Furnace Road at the CDP's western edge.

The Amtrak Auto Train to and from Florida has Lorton as its northern terminal.

Demographics
As of the census of 2010, there were 18,610 people, 6,422 households, and 4,637 families residing in the CDP. The racial makeup of the CDP was 39.0% White, 29.9% African American, 0.3% Native American, 18.2% Asian, 0.2% Pacific Islander, 7.3% some other race, and 5.1% from two or more races. Hispanic or Latino of any race were 16.7% of the population.

There were 6,422 households, out of which 45.0% had children under the age of 18 living with them, 52.5% were headed by married couples living together, 14.4% had a female householder with no husband present, and 27.8% were non-families. Of all households, 22.8% were made up of individuals, and 5.9% were someone living alone who was 65 years of age or older. The average household size was 2.88, and the average family size was 3.39.

In the CDP, the population was spread out, with 27.8% under the age of 18, 8.0% from 18 to 24, 33.0% from 25 to 44, 24.0% from 45 to 64, and 7.2% who were 65 years of age or older. The median age was 34.2 years. For every 100 females, there were 91.1 males. For every 100 females age 18 and over, there were 87.7 males.

For the period 2010 through 2014, the estimated median annual income for a household was $90,820 and the median income for a family was $94,965. Male full-time workers had a median income of $54,534 versus $54,441 for females. The per capita income for the CDP was $37,487. About 0.9% of families and 3.2% of the total population were below the poverty line, including 2.6% of those under age 18 and 2.7% of those age 65 or over.

Education
Mayor Connor Hix has implemented a new form of standardized testing known as the AP Hix Program (APHP). Lorton is part of the Fairfax Public School System. There are six elementary schools to serve Lorton residents, Gunston Elementary, Lorton Station, Silverbrook, Laurel Hill, and Halley. Hayfield Secondary School used to be the only public high school for Lorton area students, but they now attend South County High School.

Fairfax County Public Library and Annandale Library operates the Lorton Library in the CDP.

Economy

Five Guys, a hamburger chain, has its headquarters in Lorton.

In November 2020, the Fairfax County Board of Supervisors approved an interim agreement for a proposal to build one of the largest indoor ski facilities in the world in Lorton. The Alpine–X project will be constructed on the closed portion of the Interstate 95 Lorton landfill.

Retail

Considerable development has taken place in Lorton during the last few years.

Gunston Plaza Shopping Center is in the center of Lorton along US Route 1. The plaza includes a post office, Virginia DMV service center, medical clinic, dry cleaner, small office building, Dollar Tree, Food Lion grocery, Rite Aid, Golds Gym, High's, the former Polo Grill that now is a 24-hour IHOP, Vinny's, Domino's Pizza, Papa John's Pizza, Truist Bank, McDonald's, senior citizens' center, Mexican/Salvadoran restaurant, florist, computer store, and other small shops.

Several new businesses have opened in Lorton over the past few years. At the corner of Lorton Road and Lorton Market Street are Amazon Fresh, Sentara Lorton Marketplace Emergency Care Center and Advanced Imaging Center, Tokyo One Japanese Steakhouse, Virginia ABC store, Quiznos, Glory Days, Bank of America, Kung Fu Tea, Tropical Smoothie Cafe, and other shops. Near the Lorton VRE commuter rail station on Lorton Station Boulevard are Wells Fargo, Subway, Casa Tequila, K&C Pharmacy, dry cleaner, Music&Arts, salon, Lasani Kabob, FedEx/Kinkos and other shops.

Community services
Library services in the area have expanded from bookmobile service to a store front library and now to a  building. The Lorton Heritage Society has developed the Lorton History Garden on the library's south side.

Lorton is home to the Noman M. Cole, Jr., Pollution Control Plant. The Noman Cole facility is the largest advanced waste water treatment plant in the Commonwealth of Virginia.

Transportation

Rail
The Lorton VRE station is located at 8990 Lorton Station Boulevard. It is currently served by the VRE Fredericksburg Line which runs between the city of Fredericksburg to the south and Washington's Union Station to the north. This station is one mile north of the Amtrak Lorton station.
The Lorton Amtrak station is the northern terminal for Amtrak's Auto Train which runs between this station and the Sanford station in Sanford, Florida.

Bus
Fairfax Connector: Routes 171 & 307
Vamoose Bus, a privately owned company, provides daily transportation from the Lorton VRE Station parking lot to Penn Station/Madison Square Garden in Midtown Manhattan, New York City.

Emergency services
Lorton Volunteer Fire Department Company 19 is one of 12 private, non-for-profit fire companies working in partnership with Fairfax County Fire and Rescue, to provide emergency and non-emergency services.

Notable people
 George Ayittey, economist, author and president of the Free Africa Foundation
 Ben Cook, Broadway and television actor
 George Mason, one of the Founding Fathers of the United States, often called the Father of the Bill of Rights
 Travis Morrison, musician and frontman of the band The Dismemberment Plan
 Jonahan Romero, professional soccer player
 Andi Sullivan, professional soccer player for the Washington Spirit and USWNT
 Oren Burks, American football linebacker
 Sabrina Harman, corrupt US Army soldier
 Carly Fiorina

References

External links

 Lorton—Great American Stations—Amtrak
 History of Lorton prison and Nike missile site
 Lorton Volunteer Fire Department 
 

1875 establishments in Virginia
Census-designated places in Fairfax County, Virginia
Census-designated places in Virginia
Populated places established in 1875
Washington metropolitan area